Cnephasia constantinana is a species of moth of the family Tortricidae. It is found in Algeria.

References

Moths described in 1958
constantinana
Moths of Africa
Taxa named by Józef Razowski